Essi is a Finnish first name.

Essi is an abbreviation from Persian name Esther, which means star. As of May 2010, the name Essi has been given to 6507 people, one of whom was a man.

Famous Essis 
 Essi Hellstén, Suomen Neito -competition winner 2007
 Essi Luttinen, singer
 Essi Pöysti, Miss Finland 2009
 Essi Renvall, sculptor
 Essi Sainio, football player
 Essi Valta, book writer
 Essi Wuorela, singer
 Essi Vanhala, Ringette player

References 

Finnish feminine given names